is a former Japanese football player.

Playing career
Imakura was born in Saitama Prefecture on June 3, 1972. After graduating from high school, he joined his local club Mitsubishi Motors (later Urawa Reds) in 1991. In 1993, he debuted as a substitute at the 77th minute against Shimizu S-Pulse in the J1 League. However he missed a penalty shootout as the 8th kicker and the Reds lost the match. Although he played two matches in 1993, he did not play at all in 1994 and retired at the end of the 1994 season.

Club statistics

References

External links

ocn.ne.jp

1972 births
Living people
Association football people from Saitama Prefecture
Japanese footballers
Japan Soccer League players
J1 League players
Urawa Red Diamonds players
Association football forwards